John R. Showers (born April 15, 1952) is a former Democratic member of the Pennsylvania House of Representatives. He was a representative from Snyder and Union Counties. He graduated Mifflinburg Area High School in 1970. He got a Bachelor's of the Arts at American University in 1974 and a Masters of the Arts at The University of Pittsburgh in 1980. He currently serves as a Union County Commissioner.

References

Democratic Party members of the Pennsylvania House of Representatives
Living people
1952 births
People from Danville, Pennsylvania